Albert John (Jack) Pearsall (27 April 1915 – 8 November 1982) was a Liberal party member of the House of Commons of Canada. He was born in Vancouver, British Columbia and became a senior payroll clerk by career.

He was first elected at the Coast Chilcotin riding in the 1974 general election and served in the 30th Canadian Parliament. In the 1979 election, riding boundaries were changed and Pearsall campaigned in the Comox—Powell River riding, but lost to Ray Skelly of the New Democratic Party.

External links
 

1915 births
1982 deaths
Liberal Party of Canada MPs
Members of the House of Commons of Canada from British Columbia
Politicians from Vancouver